Simón Bolívar International Airport may refer to:

 Simón Bolívar International Airport (Venezuela) in Maiquetía, Venezuela, near Caracas
 Simón Bolívar International Airport (Colombia) in Santa Marta, Colombia
 José Joaquín de Olmedo International Airport, formerly Simón Bolívar International Airport, in Guayaquil, Ecuador